Isabel García Muñoz (born 1977) is a Spanish politician who was elected as a Member of the European Parliament in 2019.

Early life and career
Born on 3 March 1977 in Zaragoza, she completed studies in Telecommunications Engineering at the University of Zaragoza and also worked for the Institute for Engineering Research of Aragon's Department of Biomechanics.

Political career
García became a municipal councillor of Muel in 2007 and a Member of the Cortes of Aragon in the 2015 national elections.

García, who ran 19th in the Spanish Socialist Workers' Party list for the 2019 European Parliament election in Spain, was elected MEP. She has been serving as vice-chair of the Committee on Budgetary Control and as member of the Committee on Transport and Tourism.

In addition to her committee assignments, García is a member of the European Parliament Intergroup on Disability and the Spinelli Group.

References

1977 births
Living people
MEPs for Spain 2019–2024
21st-century women MEPs for Spain
Spanish Socialist Workers' Party MEPs
Municipal councillors in the province of Zaragoza
Members of the Cortes of Aragon